Osbern ( 1050 – c. 1095) was a Benedictine monk, hagiographer and musician, precentor of Christ Church, Canterbury. He is sometimes confused with Osbert de Clare, alias Osbern de Westminster. He is known as "the monk Osbern" or just "Monk Osbern".

Biography
He was born at Canterbury and brought up by Godric, who was dean from 1058–1080. He became a monk, and later precentor of Christ Church, and was ordained by Archbishop Lanfranc of Canterbury (d. 1089). He died probably between 1088 and 1093.

He was acquaintances, and probably close friends, with Eadmer of Canterbury, a fellow monk and historian of Canterbury a few years his junior. Eadmer related a story in which the two, in the late 1080s, searched for the relics of Saint Audoen in the crypts of Christ Church, Canterbury. Upon finding the relics, they were delighted, but the same night, were haunted by 'dreadful apparitions'. Eadmer was greatly influenced by the writing style and memories of Osbern, who could better recall late Anglo-Saxon England, and he would later rewrite and improve Osbern's hagiography of Saint Dunstan. 

He was very skillful in music and is said to have written two treatises: De re musica and De vocum consonantiis. 

But he is known best as translator of saints' lives from the Anglo-Saxon and as an original writer. William of Malmesbury praises the elegance of his style, but criticises his frequent historical inaccuracies.

Writings
Vita S. Alphegi et de translatione S. Alphegi ("Life and Translation of St Ælfheah"), in prose. It was written at Lanfranc's request, about 1080 when there arose some dispute concerning Ælfheah's sanctity. See the remarks in William of Malmesbury's Gesta Pontificum.

Patrologia Latina 149. 371–393. Available from Documenta Catholica Omnia
Wharton, Henry (ed.), "Osberno, ‘Vita s. Alphegi archiepiscopi Cantuariensis’." Anglia Sacra 2 (1691): 122–48.
Acta Sanctorum, April 2. 631.
Mabillon, "Acta Sanctorum. O.S. B", saec. Vi, 104;
Vita S. Dunstani (Life of Dunstan) and Liber Miraculorum Sancti Dunstani, written in 1070 or after Lanfranc's death. Based on earlier Life by author 'B'.
Stubbs, W. (ed.). Memorials of St Dunstan, archbishop of Canterbury. Rolls Series 63. London, 1874. 68–164.
Mabillon op. cit., saec. V, 644-84; in "Acta SS.", May 4, 359; in Patrologia Latina 137. 407. The life given in Mabillon, op. cit. (p. 684), is probably the work of Eadmer.
Vita S. Odonis archiepiscopi Cantuariensis. From William of Malmesbury's Gesta pontificum Anglorum we learn that Osbern wrote a life of Odo, but the work has now perished.
(Henry Wharton, in his Anglia Sacra (London, 1691), 75–87, published a life of St. Bregwin which was wrongly attributed to Osbern).
In addition, two letters which he wrote to Anselm abbot of Bec, probably about 1093, are preserved.
Schmitt, F.S. (ed). S. Anselmi Cantuariensis archiepiscopi opera omnia. 6 vols. 1938–61.

Notes

Sources

Goebel, Bernd "Osbern von Canterbury." in Biographisch-bibliographisches Kirchenlexikon, ed. T. Bautz. Vol. 36. 2015. 997-1004. 
Goebel, Bernd "Osbern von Canterbury". In Id., Im Umkreis von Anselm: Biographisch-bibliographische Porträts von Autoren aus Le Bec und Canterbury. 2017. 68-82.
Rubenstein, J.C. "The life and writings of Osbern of Canterbury." In Canterbury and the Norman conquest: churches, saints and scholars, 1066–1109, ed. R. Eales and R. Sharpe. 1995. 27–40.
Vaughn, Sally N. "Among These Authors are the Men of Bec: Historical Writing among the Monks of Bec." Essays in Medieval Studies 17 (2000). Online publication

External links
 
 Documenta Catholica Omnia: Vita Operaque
 

Christian hagiographers
1050s births
1090 deaths
English Christian monks
11th-century English writers
11th-century Latin writers
11th-century translators
Medieval English musicians